Ian Grant Wahn (April 18, 1916 – October 14, 1999) was a Canadian politician and lawyer. He was elected to the House of Commons of Canada as a Member of the Liberal Party in the riding of St. Paul's in the 1962 election. He was re-elected in 1963, 1965, 1968 and defeated in 1972. Prior to his federal political career, he was a captain in the Canadian Army (Supplementary Reserve).

External links 
 

 Ian Whan fonds - Library and Archives Canada

1916 births
1999 deaths
Liberal Party of Canada MPs
Members of the House of Commons of Canada from Ontario
People from Rural Municipality Excelsior No. 166, Saskatchewan
Place of death missing